The following is a list of events relating to television in Ireland from 1989.

Events
18 January – After a long absence for several years, British children's cult favourite Worzel Gummidge returns to Irish television screens. The series airs on Network 2 as part of Dempsey's Den.
5 February – The world's first commercial DBS system, Sky Television, goes on air in the United Kingdom and Ireland.
21 April – The first People in Need Telethon is broadcast by RTÉ.
10 May – American television sitcom Thirtysomething is broadcast in Ireland for the first time.
18 September – Irish television soap Fair City is first transmitted.
14 September – British children's stop motion animated series Postman Pat begins airing for the very first time ever on Irish television on Network 2 as part of Dempsey's Den after only airing in Northern Ireland and several parts of the Republic via access to British television. Also added to Thursday's lineup of children's programmes on Dempsey's Den includes the debut of the British animated series for preschoolers Spot (which was translated and dubbed into Irish as Echtrai Bhrain) and the return of television's very first animated prime time sitcom The Flintstones.
26 December – The Fireman Sam Christmas special Snow Business goes to air on Network 2 but the series itself won't return to air on RTÉ until 13 March 2000.
Undated – US prime time soap opera Knots Landing starts being broadcast for the first time on Irish television on RTÉ Television.
Undated – The American animation studio Murakami-Wolf-Swenson launches a sister company called Fred Wolf Films in Dublin.

Debuts

RTÉ 1
15 May –  Ffizz (1987–1989)
18 September – Fair City (1989–present)
16 October – RTÉ News: One O'Clock (1989–present)
22 October –  The Secret Garden (1987)
7 November –  Major Dad (1989–1993)
Undated –  Knots Landing (1979–1993)

Network 2
9 January –  Murphy Brown (1988–1998)
10 January –  Wildfire (1986)
11 January –  Degrassi Junior High (1987–1989)
14 January –  Kidsongs (1987–1998)
18 January –  Storybreak (1985–1987, 1993–1994)
6 February –  Steel Riders (1987)
6 March –  City Tails (1988)
23 March –  Doctor Snuggles (1979–1980)
3 April –  Strangers (1989)
13 April –  Wil Cwac Cwac (1982–1986)
8 May –  Adventures on Kythera (1991–1992)
9 May –  The Secret Lives of Waldo Kitty (1975)
10 May –  Thirtysomething (1987–1991)
11 May –  Cornflakes for Tea (1981)
11 May –  Wizbit (1986–1988)
15 May –  Spartakus and the Sun Beneath the Sea (1985–1987)
18 May –  Dramarama (1983–1989)
13 June – / Amigo and Friends (1979–1982)
14 July –  M*U*S*H (1975–1976)
22 July –  Joint Account (1989–1990)
3 August –  Zoo Family (1985–1986)
4 August – // Around the World with Willy Fog (1983)
9 August –  Fraidy Cat (1975–1976)
14 August –  Wacky and Packy (1975–1976)
14 September –  Spot (1987–1993)
14 September –  Postman Pat (1981, 1991, 1994, 1996, 2004–2008)
8 October –  Game, Set and Match (1988)
14 October –  The Nutt House (1989)
30 October –  Count Duckula (1988–1993)
18 November –  The Ginger Tree (1989)
24 November –  The Mahabharata (1989)
25 December –  Christmas Everyday (1986)
25 December –  Worzel Gummidge: A Cup o' Tea and a Slice o' Cake (1980)
26 December –  Fireman Sam: Snow Business (1988)

UTV
Undated – Kelly (1989–2005)

Changes of network affiliation

Ongoing television programmes

1960s
RTÉ News: Nine O'Clock (1961–present)
RTÉ News: Six One (1962–present)
The Late Late Show (1962–present)

1970s
Sports Stadium (1973–1997)
The Late Late Toy Show (1975–present)
RTÉ News on Two (1978–2014)
Bosco (1979–1996)
The Sunday Game (1979–present)

1980s
Today Tonight (1982–1992)
Mailbag (1982–1996)
Glenroe (1983–2001)
Rapid Roulette (1986–1990)
Live at 3 (1986–1997)
Saturday Live (1986–1999)
Questions and Answers (1986–2009)
Dempsey's Den (1986–2010)
Marketplace (1987–1996)
Where in the World? (1987–1996)
Know Your Sport (1987–1998)
Nighthawks (1988–1992)
Jo Maxi (1988–1993)
Kenny Live (1988–1999)

Ending this year
6 April – The Floradora Folk (1988–1989)

See also
1989 in Ireland

References

 
1980s in Irish television